Decollatura is a comune in the province of Catanzaro in the Calabria region of southern Italy. 
It was the birthplace of the Italian poet Michele Pane (1876–1953).

Twin cities
  Danbury, United States

Sources
 Imperio Assisi et al., Decollatura e Motta S. Lucia: due comunità del Reventino, Decollatura: Grafica Reventino, 1980.
 Pietro Bonacci: Decollatura, vicende sociali e religiose dal Seicento all'Ottocento, Decollatura: Grafica Reventino, 1982.
 Mario Gallo: Decollatura nella Storia, Decollatura: Grafica Reventino, 1982.

Cities and towns in Calabria